

First-team squad

In

Competitions

Pre-season

Segunda División

1997
Lleida
Lleida
Lleida